Internal exile was used to punish political dissidents by various Greek governments, including the Metaxas dictatorship, the government during the Greek Civil War, and the Greek junta. Those targeted were typically sent to smaller Greek islands. Over 100 locations were used for exile at various times in the 20th century.

Background
Internal exile has a long history of use by rulers of Greece, and in the early twentieth century was used for opponents of Venizelism, such as monarchists, conservatives or communists. During the National Schism and after the coming of Venizelos in power, in summer 1917, many political opponents (such as the former PM Spyridon Lambros) were put in internal exile.

Exile was preferred to imprisonment on the mainland because the mainland prisons were overcrowded and exile made it easier to monitor the prisoners' correspondence and limit their political influence. The 1929 Idionymon law criminalized subversive ideas as well as actions, leading to an increase in the number of prisoners. The island of Ai Stratis was used from 1929 and was not shut down until 1974. Until 1943, there were no camps and the exiles rented houses from the local residents.

Metaxas regime
Prison camps for political dissidents on barren islands were established by the Metaxas regime (1936–1941). Under Metaxas about 1,000 were sentenced to internal exile, including members of the Communist Party of Greece, socialists, trade union organizers, and others who opposed the government. Most of those imprisoned were working-class, but others were intellectuals. Prisoners sentenced to internal exile were taken to barren islands where they had to organize their own food and shelter.

Greek Civil War
During and after the Greek Civil War (1946–1949), thousands of left-wing combatants and suspected sympathizers were arrested and imprisoned. After the civil war, political prisoners continued to be held throughout the 1950s and 1960s. The island of Makronisos was used from 1947 to 1955 and became something of a "model camp" for the Greek junta. In Ai Stratis, where 5,500 people including women and children were sent between 1946 and 1947, camps were established for the first time. Twenty thousand were sent to a concentration camp on the uninhabited island of Gyaros, dubbed "Dachau of the Mediterranean". The prisoners had to work building the prison, but as soon as it was completed, the island was shut down in 1952 due to condemnation from the United Nations of the poor conditions there. Ai Stratis, designated for "unrepentant" prisoners, remained open until 1963, although the number of prisoners gradually decreased.

Greek junta
Following the coup of 21 April 1967, the junta expanded the arrest of political dissidents and the use of prison islands. Around 6,000 people were sent to Gyaros, now called the "Greek Gulag". The junta denied that political prisoners were held there, but the lie was exposed when German journalists for Stern rented a plane and photographed the island from the air, revealing the truth. Gyaros was shut down in November 1968 following international protest of its poor conditions and criticism from the Red Cross. Ai Stratis, reopened by the junta and used for individual cases, was devastated by a 1968 earthquake that destroyed much of the camp where prisoners were forced to live.

In October 1974 just before the 1974 Greek legislative election, five leaders of the junta including Georgios Papadopoulos were temporarily exiled to Kea.

Aftermath
The practice of internal exile was abolished in 1974, during the Metapolitefsi. The island of Makronisos has been protected since 1989. Greece is trying to have the island recognized by UNESCO as a World Heritage Site, to "preserv[e] the island of exile and its remaining ruins as symbols of the struggle against fascism, and of the human spirits and democracy’s triumph against oppression and dehumanization".

References

Greek exiles
Islands of Greece
Greek Civil War
Greek junta
4th of August Regime
Suppression of dissent
Political repression in Greece
Anti-communism in Greece